Arnos Vale is a town on Tobago close to Plymouth.

References 

Populated places in Tobago